Casoni is a surname. Notable people with the surname include:

 Bernard Casoni (born 1961), French football manager and player
 Filippo Casoni (1733–1811), Italian Roman Catholic cardinal
 Filippo Casoni (bishop) (1599–1659), Italian Roman Catholic bishop
 Giulia Casoni (born 1978), Italian tennis player
 Lorenzo Casoni (1645–1720), Italian Roman Catholic cardinal
 Tomaso Casoni (1880–1933), Italian physician

See also
 Casoni test

Italian-language surnames